The following are the records of Kyrgyzstan in Olympic weightlifting. Records are maintained in each weight class for the snatch lift, clean and jerk lift, and the total for both lifts by the Weightlifting Federation of Kyrgyzstan.

Men

Women

References

External links

records
Kyrgyzstan
Olympic weightlifting
weightlifting